Season 1990–91 was the 107th football season in which Dumbarton competed at a Scottish national level, entering the Scottish Football League for the 85th time, the Scottish Cup for the 96th time, the Scottish League Cup for the 44th time and the Centenary Cup for the first time.

Overview 
Hopes were high for the new season with the return of Billy Lamont at the helm however it was to be a combination of poor discipline and injuries which would in the end spoil a promising season. In fact one point from the first 5 league matches was an early concern but a subsequent unbeaten run of 8 games pulled Dumbarton within a couple of points of the leaders.  The discipline and injury problems then kicked in and took with it any hopes of promotion.  A late surge however lifted the club to a mid-table finish.

In the national cup competitions it was a case of early exits.  In Scottish Cup, Dumbarton fell in the first round to Montrose, after a drawn match.

In the League Cup, a similar story with defeat to East Stirling, on penalties, after extra time.

Finally, on the centenary year of the Scottish League, a new competition was introduced for non-Premier Division clubs.  The Centenary Cup saw Dumbarton drawn against First Division Clyde in the first round, but it was to be defeat by the odd goal in seven.

Locally, there was some cheer as Dumbarton retained the Stirlingshire Cup with a final win over East Stirling.

Results and fixtures

Scottish Second Division

Skol Cup

B&Q Centenary Cup

Tennant's Scottish Cup

Stirlingshire Cup

Pre-season/Other Matches

League table

Player statistics

Squad 

|}

Transfers

Players in

Players out

Reserve team
Dumbarton competed in the Scottish Reserve League (West), and with 6 wins and 4 draws from 30 games, finished 15th of 16.

In the Reserve League Cup, Dumbarton lost out to Hamilton in the second round.

Trivia
 The League match against East Stirling on 27 April marked John McQuade's 100th appearance for Dumbarton in all national competitions - the 98th Dumbarton player to reach this milestone.

See also
 1990–91 in Scottish football

References

External links
Paul Graham (Dumbarton Football Club Historical Archive)
Steve Marshall (Dumbarton Football Club Historical Archive)
Jim McGinlay (Dumbarton Football Club Historical Archive)
David Edgar (Dumbarton Football Club Historical Archive)
Paul McGrogan (Dumbarton Football Club Historical Archive)
T Nolan (Dumbarton Football Club Historical Archive)
G Shearer (Dumbarton Football Club Historical Archive)
Scottish Football Historical Archive

Dumbarton F.C. seasons
Scottish football clubs 1990–91 season